Charles Samuel Gubser (February 1, 1916 – August 20, 2011) was an American politician who served as a member of the United States House of Representatives from California from 1953 to 1974.

Early life and education 
Born in Gilroy, California, Gubser attended the public schools and graduated from Gilroy Union High School in 1932. After attending San Jose State College for two years, Gubser graduated from the University of California, Berkeley with a Bachelor of Arts degree in 1937, followed by two years of graduate work.

Career 
Gubser taught at Gilroy Union High School from 1939 to 1943. Gubser had been a farmer since 1940. He served as member of the California State Assembly in 1951 and 1952.

Gubser was first elected to represent California's 10th congressional district, which included San Jose and other parts of Santa Clara County, in 1952 and was sworn in on January 3, 1953. After winning re-election ten times, Gubser did not run for re-election in 1974 and resigned his seat on December 31, 1974. Gubser voted in favor of the Civil Rights Acts of 1957, 1960, 1964, and 1968, as well as the 24th Amendment to the U.S. Constitution and the Voting Rights Act of 1965.

Personal life 
Gubser died in Fresno, California, where he had lived since 2005, on August 20, 2011 at age 95.

References

1916 births
2011 deaths
Farmers from California
Republican Party members of the California State Assembly
People from Gilroy, California
People from Fresno, California
San Jose State University alumni
University of California, Berkeley alumni
Republican Party members of the United States House of Representatives from California
Schoolteachers from California
20th-century American politicians
Gilroy High School alumni